The Valea Saulei is a left tributary of the river Colentina in Romania. It flows into the Colentina in Bucharest.

References

Rivers of Romania
Rivers of Ilfov County
Rivers of Bucharest